Amaliegade 16 is a historic building located next to the Yellow Mansion in the heart of the Frederiksstaden district of central Copenhagen, Denmark. The building dates from the 1750s but was altered in the second half of the 18th century. It was listed on the Danish registry of protected buildings and places in 1918.

History

18th century
Amaliegade 16 was one of several houses in the street that was designed by Nicolai Eigtved who a few years prior had also created the masterplan for the new Frederiksstaden district. It was built after his death by his successor Lauritz de Thurah in 1756-1757 for master timber Johan Andreas Pfüntzer (ca.1708-ca.1764).

In the new cadastre of 1756, the property was listed as No. 71 K1. On Christian Gedde's map of St. Ann's East Quarter, it is marked as No. 317.

19th century

In the new cadastre of 1806, the property was listed as No. 122.

The merchant and banker Friedrich Gotschalk	 was at the time of the 1834 census residing with his wife and 9 children in the apartment on the first floor.

Architecture
Amaliegade 16 consists of three storeys over a high cellar. The building is seven bays wide and has a three-bay median risalit. The median risalit was originally tipped by a triangular pediment but it was removed in 1867 and replaced by the current three-bay wall dormer in 1895. The median risalit is divided horizontally by a cornice between the first and second floor. It originally ran along the full width of the building. The keystone above the gate features a carved coat of arms.

The roof is a Mansard roof with black tile towards the street while it is clad with winged red tile towards the courtyard. The central three-bay wall dormer is flanked by two smaller dormer windows.

A four-storey, six-bay side wing extends from the rear side of the building.

Today
Amaliegade 16 was acquired by Jeudan in 2019 and contains a combination of residential apartments and office space. Tenants include the law firms Cumberland Advokater and Invictus Advokater and the cosmetics company Tromborg.

References

External links

Listed residential buildings in Copenhagen
Houses completed in 1757
1757 establishments in Denmark
Frederiksstaden